John James Herrera (April 12, 1910 – October 12, 1986) was an American attorney, activist, and leader in the Chicano Movement.

Early life and education 
Herrera was born in Cravens, Louisiana, an unincorporated community in Vernon Parish. His great-great-grandfather was José Francisco Ruiz, a politician and soldier. Herrera was raised in Houston and graduated from Sam Houston High School, where Lyndon B. Johnson was one of his teachers. He earned a Bachelor of Laws degree from the South Texas College of Law Houston. While attending law school, Herrera supported himself by working as a laborer and taxi driver.

Career 
He joined the League of United Latin American Citizens (LULAC) in 1933 and began practicing law in Houston, Texas in 1943. During World War II, he was involved in the movement to end employment discrimination against Mexican-Americans in Houston shipyards. In 1948 he joined the legal team that brought the school-discrimination case of Minerva Delgado against the Bastrop Independent School District to the Texas Supreme Court. The ruling declared educational segregation of Mexican American students illegal in Texas. In 1954, he authored the briefs for the case of Hernandez v. Texas that argued that the exclusion of Mexican American jurors was unconstitutional. The case reached the Supreme Court of the United States, which decided in Hernandez's favor.

Herrera was also a lifelong member of the Democratic Party. He served as president of LULAC from 1952 to 1953, and continued to serve the organization throughout the 1970s and 1980s. He introduced President John F. Kennedy at a speaking engagement before a LULAC assembly on November 21, 1963, the day before his assassination.

Personal life 
Herrera died in Houston in 1986. His papers are archived at the Houston Public Library.

Trivia
 John J. Herrera Elementary School in Houston, Texas (of Houston ISD) is named after Herrera.

References

External links
Inventory of the John J. Herrera papers at the Houston Metropolitan Research Center

Activists for Hispanic and Latino American civil rights
American people of Mexican descent
People from Vernon Parish, Louisiana
People from Houston
Texas lawyers
1910 births
1986 deaths
20th-century American lawyers
Activists from Texas
League of United Latin American Citizens activists